LES or Les may refer to:

People 
 Les (given name)
 Les (surname)
 L.E.S. (producer), hip hop producer

Space flight 
 Launch Entry Suit, worn by Space Shuttle crews
 Launch escape system, for spacecraft emergencies
 Lincoln Experimental Satellite series, 1960s and 1970s

Biology and medicine 
 Lazy eye syndrome, or amblyopia, a disorder in the human optic nerve
 The Liverpool epidemic strain of Pseudomonas aeruginosa
 Lower esophageal sphincter
 Lupus erythematosus systemicus

Places
 The Lower East Side neighborhood of Manhattan, New York City
 Les, Catalonia, a municipality in Spain
 Leş, a village in Nojorid Commune, Bihor County, Romania
 Les, the Hungarian name for Leșu Commune, Bistriţa-Năsăud County, Romania
 Lesotho, IOC and UNDP country code

Transport
 Leigh-on-Sea railway station, National Rail station code
 Leytonstone tube station, London Underground station code

Other uses 
 Lake-effect snow
 Large eddy simulation in fluid dynamics
 Law Enforcement Sensitive, a US security classification
 Leave and Earnings Statement, of US military
 Les (Vietnam), a Vietnamese term for lesbians
 Les+ Magazine, a Chinese LGBT magazine
 Licensing Executives Society International, a US intellectual property organization
 Life Extension Society, a cryonics organization
 Lifetime Entertainment Services, a US company
 Lilliput Edison screw, a 5mm light bulb socket
 Louisiana Energy Services, which operates the National Enrichment Facility